Fijit Friends are a toy line directed toward girls created by Mattel, Radica Games and Girl Tech. They made their debut in July 2011 at the New York Toy Fair and are similar to the famous toy Furby. Their names are Logan (Voiced by Taylor Hawn) (blue, sporty), Serafina (Voiced by Cassandra Lee Morris) (pink, sweetie-pie), Willa (Voiced by Sirena Irwin)  (purple, trend-setting) and Sage (Voiced by Brianne Brozey) (yellow, adventurous). As of 2016, it seems as if the line has been discontinued, as no new products have been released since 2013. The former web address redirects to Mattel’s Customer service website.

Additional releases in the line are Fijit Newbies, Fijit Yippits, and Shimmies. Fijit Friends and Newbies interact with each other and Yippits can learn tricks, and make a yap or bark sound similar to a small dog. A new toy has been released to the family, the Shimmies, which first came out in 2013.

Awards
In 2012, the Fijit Friends Interactive Figures was awarded "Girl Toy of the Year" title at the 12th Annual Toy of the Year Awards, which is held at the American International Toy Fair in New York City.

References

2010s toys
Mattel